Endodesmia calophylloides is a flowering plant species of the family Calophyllaceae and the sole species comprised in the genus Endodesmia. The species is found in central Africa, most notably in Gabon, Equatorial Guinea, and Cameroon.

References 

Calophyllaceae
Monotypic Malpighiales genera